The Ladies Open of Portugal was a women's professional golf tournament on the Ladies European Tour that took place Portugal.

Winners

Source:

References

External links
Ladies European Tour
 Relevant Portuguese Golf Travel website

Portugal Open
Golf tournaments in Portugal